Elena Dementieva was the defending champion, but retired from the sport at the end of the 2010 season.

Li Na won the title, defeating Kim Clijsters in the final 7–6(7–3), 6–3.

Seeds
The top two seeds receive a bye to the second round.

Qualifying

Draw

Finals

Top half

Bottom half

References
 Main Draw

Wom
Medibank International Sydney - Women's Singles